Sringeri (IAST: Śṛngēri) also called Shringeri is a hill town and Taluk headquarters located in Chikkamagaluru district in the Indian state of Karnataka. It is the site of the first maṭha (Dakshinamnaya Sringeri Sharada Peetham) established by Adi Shankara, Hindu theologian and exponent of the Advaita Vedanta philosophy, in the 8th century CE. Located on the banks of the river Tungā, the town draws a large number of pilgrims to its temples of Sri Sharadamba, Sri Vidyashankara, Sri Malahanikareshvara and other deities.

Origin of name  

The name Sringeri is derived from Rishyashringa-giri, a nearby hill that is believed to have contained the hermitage of Rishi Vibhandaka and his son Rishyashringa. In an episode in the Bala-Kanda of the Ramayana, Vasishtha narrates how Rishyashringa brought rains to the drought-stricken kingdom of Romapada.

According to legend, Sri Adi Shankara is said to have selected the site as the place to stay and teach his disciples, because when he was walking by the Tunga river, he saw a cobra with a raised hood, providing shelter from the hot sun, to a frog undergoing labour. Astonished by the place where natural enemies had gone beyond their instincts, he stayed here for twelve years. Sri Adi Shankaracharya also established mathas in the northern (at Jyotirmath, near Badrinath), eastern (at Puri) and western (at Dwaraka) quarters of India.

Geography and climate
It has an average elevation of 672 meters (2204 feet). The average annual temperature is 23.5 °C, with the highest temperatures reaching 32 °C in April and lowest temperatures of 16 °C in winter months (December–January). There is significant rainfall (annual average of 380 cm), mostly during the months of June, July and August.

Demographics
As of the 2011 India census, Sringeri had a population of 36,539. Vokkaliga Gowdas form the largest community. Males constitute 49% of the population and females 51%. Sringeri has an average literacy rate of 86%, higher than the national average of 74%: male literacy is 90%, and female literacy is 82%. In Sringeri, 8.5% of the population is under 6 years of age.

Temples in Sringeri 
Sringeri is home to a number of historic temples. Of these, Sri Sharadamba temple, Sri Vidyashankara temple and Sri Malahanikareshwara temple are the most prominent.

Sri Sharadamba temple

The ancient temple of Sri Sharada, the presiding deity of Sringeri has a glorious history that begins with the setting up of the Dakshinamnaya Peetham by Sri Adi Shankara. Originally it was an unpretentious shrine with the idol of Sharada made of sandalwood, installed over the Sri Chakra that Sri Adi Shankara carved on a rock. Subsequently, Sri Bharati Krishna Tirtha and Sri Vidyaranya had a temple built in the Kerala style, with timber and tiled roof, and substituted the sandalwood idol with the present golden idol.

Sri Sacchidananda Shivabhinava Nrisimha Bharati raised the present structure in granite around the sanctum and Sri Chandrasekhara Bharati consecrated the new temple in May 1916. Sri Abhinava Vidyatirtha made several improvements in the temple. The mahamandapam has large stone pillars exquisitely carved with deities like Durga, Raja Rajeshwari, dwarapalakas and devis which are all sculpted according to the shilpa sastras practiced in Tamilnadu.

Construction of the 127 feet tall Rajagopuram entrance was completed in 2014 and its Kumbhabhishekam (grand inauguration) was performed by Sri Bharati Tirtha Mahaswamiji on 8 June 2014, the day of Jaya Samvatsariya Jyeshtha Shuddha Dashami.

In addition to Sri Sharadamba temple, the following temples and shrines are within the temple complex:

 Sri Thorana Ganapathy 
 Sri Adi Shankaracharya 
 Sri Shakthi Ganapathy 
 Sri Kodandaramaswamy 
 Sri Malayala Brahma 
 Sri Sureshwaracharya 
 Sri Vageeswari Vidyaranya 
 Sri Janardhanaswamy 
 Sri Anjaneya 
 Sri Garuda 
 Sri Balasubrahmanyaswamy

Sri Vidyashankara temple

The Vidyashankara temple was built in the year 1338 A.D., in commemoration of the pontiff Sri Vidyashankara, by Sri Vidyaranya, patron-saint of Harihara and Bukka, the brothers who founded the Vijayanagara empire. Inscriptions in the temple record contributions made by several Vijayanagara emperors but the temple was probably built on an earlier Hoysala site as it combines Hoysala (Chalukya) and Vijayanagara (Dravida) architectural features. It is built entirely of stone and stands on a high plinth, more or less a rectangle with apsidal east-west ends. On the western side is the garbhagriha, with Vidya Ganapati on one side and Durga on the other side. On the other three sides of the garbhagriha are shrines to Brahma, Vishnu and Maheshwara with their consorts. 

In the eastern half of the structure is a mantapa with twelve pillars (popularly known as rashi stambhas), marked by the twelve signs of the zodiac. The rays of the sun fall on each of them in the order of the twelve solar months. On the floor is a large circle, marked with converging lines to indicate the direction of the shadows. The central ceiling is an exquisite piece of workmanship with lotus and pecking parrots. The vimana over the garbhagriha rises with shikhara, mahapadma and stupa. The rest of the roof is made up of sloping channeled slab. The basement is elaborately sculpted with animals, puranic stories, Shiva, Vishnu, Dashavatara, Kali, Shanmukha and so on. Other intricate features include chains of stone rings and growling lions with stone balls inside the faces, which can be rotated. The temple is under the care of the Archaeological Survey of India.

Vidyatirtha Rathotsava is celebrated on a grand scale during kartika shukla paksha. The festival spans for seven days from tritiya to navami. On the saptami day Jagadguru Bharathi Teertha Mahaswamiji performs special puja. The aradhana of Sri Vidya Shankara is performed on shasti, saptami and ashtami.

Sri Malahanikareshvara temple 

Malahanikaresvara means destroyer of the impurities of the soul. This serene temple is located at the centre of the Sringeri town, atop a small hill, and can be reached by a flight of about 170 steps. The temple structure is a fine piece of architecture in stone, consisting of navaranga, antarala and garbhagrha. The ceiling has a lotus bud carving. The deities inside the temple include Malahanikaresvara, Bhavani, Chandikeshwara, Durga and Sthambha Ganapati. The linga is said have been worshiped by Sage Vibhandaka, son of Sage Kashyapa. After many years of penance, Vibhandaka had the vision of the Lord and merged into the Linga. The Sthanbha Ganapati was created in stone by Sri Ahinava Narasimha Bharati (1599 – 1622), the 24th Jagadguru, by drawing a figure of Ganesha with a piece of turmeric on one of the front pillars. Outside the temple, there are small shrines of Meenakshi Sachidanandeshvara, Kshetra Palaka and Bindu Madhava.

On Mahashivaratri, the Jagadguru performs special Puja to the Lord. On Kartika Poornima day, Laksha Deepothsavam is celebrated on a grand scale in the presence of the Jagadguru.

Temples of guardian deities
Sri Adi Shankara also established guardian deities around Sringeri in four directions.

Kala Bhairava Temple in the East
Kere Anjaneya Temple in the West
Kalikamba Temple in the North
Durgamba Temple in the South

Sri Parshwanath Swamy Basadi

Sri Parshwanath Basadi (Digambar Jain Temple) is situated in the heart of Sringeri Town. This basadi was built in the memory of Mari Setty whose origin goes to one Vijayanagara Shanthi Shetty of Nidugodu village near Belur. The date of construction comes to about 1150 A.D. The main temple is 50 feet long and 30 feet wide. Completely built of stone it has a sloped roof. The Basadi consists of Garbhagriha, Sukhanasi, Navaranga, Mukha Mandapa and Pradakshina Patha.

In the Garbhagriha, there is the idol of Sri Parshwanatha Swamy, the presiding deity made of black stone. It is one foot high and on its base, the words Srimathparisanathaya Namaha are inscribed. Generally a single cobra holds its hood over the Lord’s head. But here, the specialty is that a pair of cobras intertwined hold their seven hoods like an umbrella. Hence this deity is known as Jodi Parshwanatha Swamy.

In the sukhanasi the idol of Goddess Padmavati is kept. It is about nine inches in height and is made of black stone. Besides this there are also Jina images of marble, sphatika, black stone and the bronze images of 24 tirthankaras in the Gandhakuti, as well as idols of Brahma, Saraswathi, and Ganadharas.

Sringeri Sharada Peetha 

The Sringeri Sharada Peetha or Matha is located South of the Sri Sharadamba temple, across the Tunga river, in Narasimha Vana. A foot bridge, called Vidyatheertha Setu connects the two sides. The Sringeri Sharada Peetha, also called Dakshinamnaya Sringeri Sharada peetam, is one of the four Hindu Advaita maths established by Sri Adi Shankara. Following the tradition initiated by Adi Shankara, the maţha is in charge of the Yajur Veda (the Krishna (Black) Yajurveda is more prevalent in South India, over which the maţha has authority in the Smarta tradition). The head of the matha is called Jagadguru (teacher to the world) and also carries the Shankaracharya name as a title. The present Sringeri Shankaracharya Shri Bharati Tirtha Swamiji has nominated Jagadguru Vidhushekhara Bharathi as his successor.

Nearby places of interest 
There are several other historic temples and places of interest around Sringeri.

Sri Chaturmurti Vidyeshwara temple, Simhagiri 
Simhagiri (old Sringeri) is a small village about 2 km from Sringeri bus stand and comes on the way to Vidyaranyapura. It was established by the Sri Simhagiri Mahaswami, the 7th Jagadguru who had adorned the Sringeri Peetham in the 11th century. Sri Chaturmurti Vidyeshwara temple contains a statue combining four idols, that of Sri Vidyatirtha, Bhahma, Vishnu and Shiva. The village houses several priests of the temples in Sringeri.

Rajiv Gandhi Kendriya Sanskrit Vidyapeetha, Menase 
Menase is around 4 km from Sringeri bus stand, on the road to Balehonnur. Rajiv Gandhi Kendriya Sanskrit Vidyapeetha was established in 1992, as one of the campus of Central Sanskrit University, New Delhi. Its foundation stone was laid by Sri Bharati Teertha Mahaswamiji in the presence of Shri R. Venkataraman, the then President of India. The 10 acre campus includes hostels for boys and girls.

Sri Rishyashringeshwara temple, Kigga 
Kigga is a small village located 9 km from Sringeri. Sri Rishyashrungeshwara temple is located on the banks of Nandini river, a tributary of Tunga. Built during Vijayanagara period, the temple houses a linga of a unique shape, with three protuberances resembling horns. There is a big Nandi statue in front of the temple. Sage Rishyasringa is said to have performed penance here. It is believed that the worship of the linga averts famine in the land up to a distance of 12 yojanas (100 miles). The rathotsavam of the temple is conducted in the month of Chaitra (March/April).

Sirimane falls, near Kigga 
Sirimane falls is situated at a distance of 12 km from Sringeri, and 5 km from Kigga. Visitors can take a bus from Sringeri to Kigga, then hire a local autorikshaw (3-wheeler) to reach the falls.

Sri Sharada Lakshminarasimha Peetam, Hariharapura 
Hariharipura is about 20 km from Sringeri. Here, Sri Sharada Lakshminarasimha Peetam was established by Sri Adi Shankaracharya on the banks of the River Tunga. The place is serene amidst forest, Arecanut farms and rice fields surrounded by small hills. There is a 110 year old bridge across the Tunga connecting Hariharipura to Koppa. This bridge is believed to have been built by Sir M Visvesvaraya.

How to reach 
The nearest airport is Mangalore International airport, at a distance of 105 km in South-West direction by road via Karkala. The town of Udupi, connected to Mumbai via Konkan Railway, is at distance of 84 km by road in the Western direction via Hebri and Agumbe. Shimoga (Shivamogga) is 95 km by road in North-East direction. Chikmagalur is at a distance of 86 km by road in Eastern direction, connected to Bengaluru through road and rail line via Kadur. Birur Jn / Kadur is connected via rail from Hyderabad, Several travel agencies including KSRTC, SRS and Sugama operate AC and non-AC luxury buses between Sringeri and Bengaluru, a distance of 320 km.

Where to stay 
Visitors to Sringeri have several options for accommodation. The Sringeri Sharada Peetham runs guest houses located near the Sri Sharadamba temple. There are also many private lodges, most of them on the Bharthi Street and Harihara Street, and one near Shankaracharya Circle.

Best time to Visit 
Since Sringeri is situated in the Malnad region spanning the Western Ghats, the best time to visit is between October and March.

See also

Agumbe
Belur and Halebidu 
Dharmasthala 
Hanumanagundi falls
Karkala
Kundadri hills
 Horanadu
Mangalore
 Chikmagalur
Subramanya

References

External links

 
 A Photo Essay of Sringeri
 Some offbeat photos of Sringeri
 Shankara Sringeri
 Sri Parshwanath Swamy Digambar Jain Temple

Hindu temples in Chikkamagaluru district
Cities and towns in Chikkamagaluru district
Populated places in the Western Ghats
Tourism in Karnataka
Hill stations in Karnataka
Hindu holy cities